Symmetra, real name Satya Vaswani is a fictional, playable character of Indian origin in Overwatch, a character-driven shooter video game in which players compose teams based on the complementary skills of characters to win the game's objective. The character's abilities center around use of turrets and teleporters to redirect the momentum of battle. Redesigned twice, in 2016 and 2018, Symmetra was introduced as a support character who provided shields for teammates, but in her current incarnation, she focuses on high damage output. The character is the first playable video game character to identify as autistic, though the developers downplayed the trait to avoid tokenization. Like many other characters in the game, such as Cassidy, Genji, and Torbjorn, Symmetra is an amputee, with a cybernetic arm. Symmetra is a divisive choice for players composing teams, as a result of the hybridity of roles she can play and her association with bad faith players. These factors contribute to her standing among the game's least selected characters, both in casual and professional play.

Background 

Overwatch is a character-driven shooter video game in which players compose teams based on the complementary skills of characters to win the match's objective, such as capturing an area or escorting a payload. Blizzard Entertainment, the video game's developer, subtly recommends changes in team composition while players select "hero" characters, such that teams evenly distribute the benefits of its character roster's class-based roles: the damage-absorbing "tanks", the damage-dealing "damage", and the team-buffing "support". Over 60 million players have played Overwatch and its professional league similarly has millions of viewers.

Design 

Symmetra, one of Overwatch original 21 playable characters, has received multiple redesigns. Symmetra was originally designed to be played on defense with a move set that controlled the field of play with turrets that slowed enemies and a teleporter that quickly returned teammates to the fray. The character was situationally best suited for short-range defense around a choke point, but overall occupied a support role: slowing enemies, buffing teammates, and hiding turrets and teleporters. She was classified as a "support" character despite her team role being a combination of "defense" and "builder" abilities.

As part of her initial special abilities, Symmetra could place up to six turrets on surfaces to damage and slow enemy passersby. When positioned inside corridors out of direct enemy sight, they could force enemies to turn around before proceeding. Symmetra could also give each teammate a small, passive shield. Her "ultimate" ability was a finite-use teleporter that generated an entrance at her team's spawn room and an exit at her current location. This helped slow teammates return quicker, especially when the fight is farthest from the team spawn. The character's primary attack was a photon beam that, when activated, automatically targeted the enemy closest to the player's crosshairs. The beam's intensity increased with its duration. Symmetra's comparably more powerful secondary attack fired slow-charging, slow-moving photon orbs that could pass through shields and counter stationary or large enemies.

This initial design had multiple drawbacks. Symmetra served as an alternative choice of support hero, since her lack of healing abilities required other teammates to fill that role. Her turrets were weak and quickly destroyed when discovered. Her teleporter provided little use to teammates when defending the final objective of a game, when there was little travel distance to the fight. Combined with the ramp-up time to reach full charge on her primary attack at close range, players were unlikely to last long in skirmishes and ultimately chose other heroes. In 2016, Symmetra was the least selected character of the original release's roster.

2016 rework 

Blizzard added new shield abilities to Symmetra's design in December 2016, within months of the game's launch. The company addressed the limited applicability of the character's teleporter "ultimate" ability by providing an alternative "ultimate" option: a shield generator, constructed and advantageously hidden like the teleporter, that gave her team defensive protection. Blizzard also created a projectile photon barrier ability, which absorbed incoming fire while it propelled forward, until it broke upon colliding with a wall. In exchange for these abilities, the developers removed the small, passive shield that the original design once doled out to teammates. The changes shaped Symmetra into a more versatile support from her reputation as a clincher built only for defense. But the criticism of her other abilities went unresolved and the character choice became associated with griefing, trolling, and general unseriousness, especially as Blizzard's new, professional Overwatch League reflected zero playtime with Symmetra within its first season. In early 2018, her selection rate remained among the roster's lowest.

2018 rework 

Symmetra's second redesign, released in June 2018 alongside a bevy of other quality-of-life game improvements, and moved the character's class from "support" to "damage". The changes reinforced higher damage output: her primary attack (a photon beam) no longer auto-locked to targets but dealt more damage, her secondary attack both charges and shoots faster, and her fewer turrets became projectiles that could be fired towards enemies to deal damage as they traveled to deploy on hard-to-reach walls behind them. Additionally, Symmetra players could charge the power and ammo of their primary attack by aiming at shields. The biggest change, however, was Symmetra's teleporter, which moved from an "ultimate" to a regular ability that builds a teleporter in the distance and at the character's current position. This lets teammates quickly escape from firefights, gives lumbering teammates immediate access to platforms normally out-of-reach, and makes for unexpected tactics such as flanking behind an enemy team or shooting projectiles between the portals. As a result, Symmetra was better able to affect the momentum of battle through these abilities. Symmetra's new "ultimate" ability is a single, stationary photon wall that stretches infinitely across the map, absorbing incoming damage for up to 15 seconds. It is most effective when nullifying an enemy ultimate or fighting in close quarters. It is less useful when escorting a payload and can be harder for less experienced players to construct and time strategically when countering an enemy attack.

The rework supported new tactical playstyles leading to her finally being used within the Overwatch League within the first day of the 2019 season.

With the introduction of Role Queue in August 2019, in which teams in competitive play must be made up of two Tanks, two Supports, and two Damage heroes, Blizzard further tweaked Symmetra to make her better fit the Damage Hero role, notably making her teleporter permanent on the map unless destroyed or dismissed by Symmetra. Alongside other changes from the Role Queue update, Symmetra became more common in play in competitive matches and considered to be an essential Hero for a team to help overwhelm their opponents.

Lore 

In the game's backstory, the Indian Vishkar Corporation developed a "hard light" technology in which physical objects can be constructed from light. Satya Vaswani, one of Vishkar's star "architechs", was spirited away from an impoverished youth and trained to create such objects. After helping to build a city out of hard light, she was assigned to expand Vishkar's global reach and received the codename "Symmetra". Symmetra is written as an autistic character. Her dialogue reflects a desire for order and aversion for overstimulation. The character is voiced by Anjali Bhimani, an Indian-American actor who has appeared in television episodes including that of Modern Family.

A 10-page comic book featuring Symmetra was released in May 2016, prior to Overwatch launch. The comics alluded to Symmetra's autism in her inner dialogue and discomfort in crowds, but the association went without remark until confirmed in a fan letter in mid-2017.

Development 
Symmetra was one of the first twelve playable characters introduced upon the reveal of Overwatch at the November 2014 BlizzCon event.

Blizzard let Symmetra's backstory grow organically. They initially developed Symmetra's Vishkar Corporation storyline with little relation to the rest of Overwatch but later saw opportunities to expand while developing stories for other characters. The developers elected against tokenizing Overwatch character traits, including Symmetra's autism, so as to instead emphasize their characters as an amalgam of traits.

Reception 

Symmetra is traditionally the least selected character in hero-based shooter game's roster, which together with her multiple redesigns reflect her divisive capacity in Overwatch team composition. Players widely differ with regard to her essentiality to any team, partly exacerbated by the wider range of character classes she occupies in comparison to the rest of Overwatch roster: defense, support, damage, and builder.

While Symmetra is infrequently selected by players, the character is associated with players who mainly practice the single character ("Symmetra mains") and refuse to switch. These players built an online Reddit community and some have invested hundreds of hours in play, preferring the character for what they see as opportunities for strategic, critical thinking afforded by her hybrid team roles. Outside of this community, selecting Symmetra became associated with griefing and trolling, which proliferated as a stereotype when additional bad actors adopted the character to mask their poor sportsmanship. In an ensuing backlash, frustrated teammates increasingly accused Symmetra mains of bad faith, especially when their character choice appeared inopportune for a winning team composition. Some Symmetra players were banned a result of "poor teamwork" complaints filed by teammates. Following the character's second redesign, which changed her team function from "support" to "damage", players continued to perceive Symmetra players as having insincere intentions. Symmetra mains often report high abuse from their teammates, some of whom perceive Symmetra as a joke that embodies the aspects of Overwatch that they loathe. Symmetra mains have countered that the game is not designed to highlight their contributions to team objectives and that their teammates misunderstand the value she brings to a team composition.

Symmetra is one of the first playable video game characters explicitly stated as being autistic. A playable character with a backstory of mild autism from Clive Barker's Jericho (2007) predates Symmetra.

References

Further reading

External links 

 
 Gamepedia wiki page for character stats and additional plot details

Amputee characters in video games
Comics characters introduced in 2016
Female characters in comics
Female characters in video games
Fictional architects
Fictional characters on the autism spectrum
Fictional characters who can manipulate light
Fictional Indian people in video games
Overwatch characters
Video game characters introduced in 2016
Video game characters who can teleport